Loabi Veveynee Furaana Dheegen is a 1992 Maldivian drama film directed by Yoosuf Rafeeu. Produced by Bukhari Films, the film stars Rafeeu, Mariyam Shakeela and Haajara Abdul Kareem in pivotal roles.

Premise
Aadhanu (Yoosuf Rafeeu) a hardworking unappealing man does everything in his capability to please a young woman and a student, Mariyam (Mariyam Shakeela). Mariyam avoids Aadhanu noting his displeasing features though her mother, Dhon Kamana (Haajara Abdul Kareem) is slightly gratified with his service. A romantic relationship grows between Mariyam and her teacher.

Cast 
 Yoosuf Rafeeu as Aadhanu
 Mariyam Shakeela as Mariyam
 Haajara Abdul Kareem as Dhon Kamana
 Hussain Athif
 Sithi Fulhu as Sithi
 Ibrahim Fulhu
 Mohamed Athif
 Ali Mohamed Zaidhee
 Ibrahim Shakir

Soundtrack

References

Maldivian drama films
1992 films
1992 drama films
Dhivehi-language films